George Swede, (born as Juris Puriņš, November 20, 1940 in Riga, Latvia) is a Latvian Canadian psychologist, poet and children's writer who lives in Toronto, Ontario. He is a major figure in English-language haiku, known for his wry, poignant observations.

Life
In 1947, Swede arrived with his mother and stepfather from post-WW II Europe to live with his maternal grandparents on a fruit farm in Oyama, British Columbia and, when his stepfather died in 1950, Swede moved with his mother to Vancouver where he finished junior high and high school. Then he studied at the University of British Columbia, where he graduated with a B.A. in Psychology in 1964. After that, he worked briefly as a psychologist at B.C. Penitentiary in New Westminster. In 1965, he got an M.A. at Dalhousie University.

From 1966 to 1967, Swede was a psychology instructor at Vancouver City College, after which he worked as a school psychologist at the Scarborough Board of Education in Toronto until 1968.

He resumed his academic career at Ryerson University, where he stayed as member of the psychology department from 1968 to 2006 (as chair from 1998 to 2003). From 1970 to 1975 he served as Director for Developmental Psychology at Ryerson Open College, a virtual university which broadcast lectures by radio (on CJRT-FM) and TV (CBC and CTV) from 1970 to 1975; and from 1993 to 2000 he was engaged in Ryerson University Now (RUN), an initiative to get bright but disadvantaged students interested in going to university. This was achieved by enrolling Vaughan Road Academy students in a university level introductory psychology course that Swede taught. Most graduated and many received scholarships to attend university.

Swede retired in 2006 and was awarded Honorary Life Membership by the Canadian Psychological Association in 2007. For the 2008-2009 term, he was named the Honorary Curator of the American Haiku Archives at the California State Library in Sacramento, California.

The George Swede Papers, thus far from 1968 to 2012, are at the Fisher Library, University of Toronto.

Swede began writing poetry in the late 1960s and published in such journals as 
Antigonish Review
Canadian Forum;
Grain
New Quarterly
Open Letter
Piedmont Literary Review;
Quarry Magazine
Rampike
Tamarack Review
Toronto Life

An interest in short form Japanese poetry began in 1976 when he was asked to review Makoto Ueda's Modern Japanese Haiku (University of Toronto Press, 1976).

Swede then began publishing in such journals as 
Acorn
American Tanka
Cicada
Frogpond
Industrial Sabotage
Inkstone
Mainichi Daily News, Haiku in English
Modern Haiku
Simply Haiku

In 1977, along with Betty Drevniok and Eric Amann, Swede co-founded Haiku Canada. At its 30th anniversary held in Ottawa in May 2007, Haiku Canada awarded Swede an Honorary Life Membership. In an interview with Alok Mishra, Editor-in-Chief, Ashvamegh, Swede spoke about the poets who have influenced him—Dylan Thomas, Leonard Cohen, Ezra Pound and others.

A blending of his interests in poetry and psychology is illustrated by his refereed article in The International Handbook on Innovation, Poetic Innovation, which explores the psychological, sociological and cultural factors that determine whether someone becomes a professional poet.

Swede's work has been reviewed in numerous literary magazines, such as 
Canadian Literature
Books in Canada
Canadian Children's Literature

In-depth examinations of Swede's work have appeared in the following: 
Ryerson Magazine
Poetry Toronto
Origin
CJRT-FM: Contemporary Poets
What;
Canadian Author & Bookman
TVOntario: In Conversation With . . .
Blithe Spirit
BBC Radio 3: Close To Silence
Amanda Hill on George Swede
haijinx
Simply Haiku
 Hirschfield, R.″George Swede: Haiku Master & Secular Contemplative″ Beshara MagazineIssue 22, 2022, United Kingdom, 15 pars.
 Hirschfield, R. ″Discovering George Swede:The Timeless World of Haiku.″ ″3rd Act Magazine″ Winter 2022/23, U.S.A., 21 pars.
From 2008 to 2012 he was editor of Frogpond, the journal of the Haiku Society of America.

He is a founder member of the Intercultural Renku Group.

Swede is married with two children.

Awards
Co-winner, High/Coo Press Mini-Chapbook Competition, 1982 for "All of Her Shadows"
Museum of Haiku Literature Award, "Frogpond", 5:4, 1983
Museum of Haiku Literature Award, "Frogpond", 8:2, 1985
"Our Choice", Canadian Children's Book Centre, 1984, 1985, 1987, 1991, 1992 
Museum of Haiku Literature Award, "Frogpond", 15:2, 1992
First Prize, "Mainichi Daily News" Haiku Contest in English, 1994 
Second Prize, "Mainichi Daily News" 125th Anniversary Haiku Contest, 1997 
Third Prize, Harold G. Henderson Haiku Contest, Haiku Society of America, 1997
First Prize, The Snapshot Press Tanka Collection Competition 2005 for "First Light, First Shadows" 
Associate, The Haiku Foundation, 2008
Honorary Curator, American Haiku Archives, 2008/09
Second Prize, "Mainichi Daily News" Haiku Contest in English, 2008
Scorpion Prize, "Roadrunner" 2010, 10:1 Judged by Marjorie Perloff 
Second Prize (Tokusen), Foreign Language Category, Kusamakura International Haiku Competition, 2010
Honorable Mention, Touchstone Book Awards 2010 for "Joy In Me Still"
Grand Prize (Taisho), Foreign Language Category, Kusamakura International Haiku Competition, 2011
First Honorable Mention, Kanterman Book Awards 2011 for "Joy In Me Still"
Scorpion Prize, "Roadrunner" 2012, 12:2 Judged by Mark Wallace 
Honorable Mention, Touchstone Book Awards 2014 for "micro haiku: three to nine syllables"
Honorable Mention, Mildred Kanterman Merit Book Award, Haiku Society of America, 2015, for "micro haiku: three to nine syllables" 
First Prize, Mildred Kanterman Merit Book Award, Haiku Society of America, 2017, for ″Helices″ 
One of 4 Winners, e-Chapbook Awards, 2019 for "Arithmetic"

Bibliography
Unwinding (Toronto, ON, Canada: Missing Link, 1974)
Tell-tale Feathers (Fredericton, N. B., Canada: Fiddlehead, 1978) 
Endless Jigsaw (Toronto, ON, Canada: Three Trees, 1978) 
A Snowman, Headless (Fredericton, N. B., Canada: Fiddlehead, 1979) 
(ed.), Canadian Haiku Anthology (Toronto, ON, Canada: Three Trees, 1979) 
Wingbeats (La Crosse, WI, USA: Juniper, 1979)
As Far As The Sea Can Eye (Toronto, ON, Canada: York, 1979) 
The Case of the Moonlit Goldust (Toronto, ON, Canada: Three Trees, 1979)  Illustrated by Danielle Jones
This Morning's Mockingbird (Battle Ground, IN, USA: High/Coo, 1980) ; 
The Case of the Missing Heirloom (Toronto, ON, Canada: Three Trees, 1980)   Illustrated by Danielle Jones
with Anita Krumins, Quillby, The Porcupine Who Lost His Quills (Toronto: Three Trees Press, 1980)  Illustrated by Martin Lewis
Eye to Eye with a Frog (La Crosse, WI, USA: Juniper, 1981)
The Case of the Seaside Burglaries (Toronto, ON, Canada: Three Trees, 1981)  Illustrated by Danielle Jones
The Modern English Haiku (Toronto: Columbine Editions, 1981)  Illustrated by Aiko Suzuki
All of Her Shadows (Battle Ground, IN, USA: High/Coo, 1982) ; 
The Case of the Downhill Theft (Toronto, ON, Canada: Three Trees, 1982)  Illustrated by Paul Kantorek
Binary Poem (Toronto, ON, Canada: Curvd H&Z, 1982)
Undertow (Toronto, ON, Canada: Three Trees, 1982) 
Biased Sample (Toronto: The League of Canadian Poets, 1982)
Tick Bird: Poems for Children (Toronto, ON, Canada: Three Trees, 1983)  Illustrated by Katherine Helmer
Frozen Breaths (Glen Burnie, MD, USA: Wind Chimes, 1983)
(ed.), Cicada Voices: Selected Haiku of Eric Amann 1966-1979 (Battle Ground, IN, USA: High/Coo, 1983) 
Flaking Paint (Toronto, ON, Canada: Underwhich, 1983)
Bifids (Toronto, ON Canada: CURVD H&Z, 1984)
Night Tides (London, ON, Canada: South Western Ontario Poetry, 1984) ; 
Time Is Flies: Poems for Children (Toronto, ON, Canada: Three Trees, 1984)  Illustrated by Darcia Labrosse
Dudley and the Birdman (Toronto, ON, Canada: Three Trees, 1985) ) Illustrated by Gary McLaughlin
Dudley and the Christmas Thief (Toronto, ON, Canada: Three Trees, 1986)  Illustrated by Allan and Deborah Drew-Brook-Cormack
High Wire Spider: Poems for Children (Toronto, ON, Canada: Three Trees, 1986)  Illustrated by Victor Gad
with Eric Amann, LeRoy Gorman, The Space Between (Glen Burnie, MD, USA: Wind Chimes, 1986) 
I Eat a Rose Petal (Aylmer, QC, Canada: Haiku Canada, 1987)
Multiple Personality (North Vancouver, BC, Canada: Silver Birch, 1987)
Leaping Lizard: Poems for Children (Stratford, ON, Canada: Three Trees, 1988)  Illustrated by Kimberley Hart
with jwcurry, Where Even the Factories Have Lawns (Toronto, ON, Canada: Gesture, 1988) 
I Throw Stones at the Mountain (Glen Burnie, MD, USA: Wind Chimes, 1988)
Holes in My Cage: Poems for Young Adults (Toronto, ON, Canada: Three Trees, 1989) 
(ed.),The Universe is One Poem: Four Poets Talk Poetry (Toronto, ON, Canada: Simon & Pierre, 1990) 
I Want to Lasso Time (Toronto, ON, Canada: Simon & Pierre, 1991) 
Leaving My Loneliness (Pointe Claire, QC, Canada: King's Road Press, 1992) 
(ed.),There will Always be a Sky (Toronto, ON, Canada: Nelson Canada, 1993) 
Creativity. A New Psychology (Toronto, ON, Canada: Wall & Emerson, 1993) 
The Psychology of Art : An Experimental Approach (Toronto, ON, Canada: Canadian Scholar's, 1994) 
with George Amabile, Leonard Gasparini, Seymour Mayne, and Ted Plantos, Five O'Clock Shadows (Toronto, ON, Canada: Letters Bookshop, 1996) 
My Shadow Doing Something (Enfield, CT, USA: Tiny Poems, 1997)
bugs (Napanee, ON, Canada: pawEpress, 1998)
(ed. with Randy Brooks), Global Haiku: Twenty-Five Poets World-Wide (New York, NY, USA: Mosaic, 2000) 
(ed. with Eva Tomaszewska, trans), Antologia Haiku Kanadyjskiego /"Canadian Haiku Anthology (Kraków, Poland: Wydawnictswo Krytiki Artsitycznej Miniatura, 2003) 
Almost Unseen: Selected Haiku (Decatur, IL, USA: Brooks Books, 2000) 
First Light, First Shadows (Liverpool, UK: Snapshot Press, 2006) ; 
Joy In Me Still (Edmonton: Inkling Press, 2010) 
White Thoughts, Blue Mind (Edmonton: Inkling Press, 2010) 
(ed.), The Ultra Best Short Verse (Toronto: Beret Days Press, 2013) 
embryo: eye poems (Toronto: Iņšpress, 2013) 
(with Daniel Py, translator), Le Haïku moderne en Anglais (Rosny-sous-Bois: Éditions unicité, 2013)  
micro haiku: three to nine syllables (Toronto: Iņšpress, 2014) 
helices (Winchester, VA: Red Moon Press, 2016) 
(ed.),The Ultra Best Short Verse 2016 (Toronto: Beret Days Press, 2017) 
(with Francisco José Craveiro de Carvalho, translator), um mosquito no meu braço(Leça da Palmeira, Portugal: Poetas da Eufeme #03)
(ed. with Terry Ann Carter), Erotic Haiku: Of Skin On Skin (Windsor, ON, Canada: Black Moss Press, 2017) 
Arithmetic
Endangered Metaphors(Højby, Denmark: Bones Library, 2020)
(with Sina Sanjari, translator of 50 haiku into Persian)Mist At Both Ends Of The Bridge(Vancouver, B.C.:Shahrgon Magazine, pp. 19,20)

External links
 Personal Website

References

1940 births
Living people
20th-century Canadian poets
Canadian male poets
English-language haiku poets
Canadian children's writers
Latvian emigrants to Canada
Latvian World War II refugees
20th-century Canadian male writers